Koko: A Talking Gorilla is a 1978 French documentary film directed by Barbet Schroeder that focuses on Francine Patterson and her work with Koko, the gorilla. Patterson claims to have taught Koko to communicate with humans using symbols taken from American Sign Language. The film was screened in the Un Certain Regard section at the 1978 Cannes Film Festival.

Synopsis
The film introduces Koko soon after she was brought from the San Francisco Zoo to Stanford University by Francine Patterson for a controversial experiment. She would be taught American Sign Language.

Reception
Janet Maslin of The New York Times called the film "handsomely photographed", and wrote: "Koko does present some fascinating insights into matters of behavior and education. And Mr. Schroeder has assembled this funny, provocative documentary with gratifying intelligence and care."

Home media
Koko: A Talking Gorilla was released on VHS. In 2010, the film was released on DVD by the Criterion Collection.

References

External links
 
 Barbet and Koko: An Equivocal Love Affair an essay by Gary Indiana at the Criterion Collection

1978 films
American Sign Language films
Documentary films about mammals
Documentary films about words and language
1970s French-language films
French documentary films
Films directed by Barbet Schroeder
Films about gorillas
1978 documentary films
Films produced by Barbet Schroeder
Films produced by Margaret Ménégoz
1970s English-language films
1970s French films